Electoral districts of Kazakhstan are a series of single-member districts in Kazakhstan used to represent and elect members of lower chamber Mäjilis in the Parliament. These electoral districts, along with party-list proportional representation seats, constitute a single system of mixed-member majoritarian representation, with 29 members from each constituency being represented in the elected body of the Mäjilis.

The history of electoral districts in Kazakhstan date back to the Communist era, when lawmakers represented every constituency in the Supreme Soviet of the Kazakh SSR. In the early 1990s, during Kazakhstan's independence, a mixed electoral system was introduced and eventually led to the reduction of seats in the Mäjilis and replacement with full proportional representation after the 2007 amendments. However, the mixed system was reinstated after the 2022 referendum, thus restoring a number of previously dissolved electoral districts of the Mäjilis.

Under constitutional law, the Central Election Commission oversees formation of Mäjilis electoral districts in each region and city of republican significance (Almaty, Astana, and Shymkent). Each administrative division must have at least one constituent seat to be ensured with representation in the Mäjilis.

List

References 

 
Elections in Kazakhstan
Kazakhstan